Joshua Davis House may refer to:

Joshua Davis House (Mt. Pleasant, Florida), listed on the National Register of Historic Places (NRHP)
Joshua Davis House (Orem, Utah), also NRHP-listed
Joshua Davis House (North Kingstown, RI), also NRHP-listed

See also
Davis House (disambiguation)
Joshua Davis (disambiguation)